Virginia, officially the Commonwealth of Virginia, is a state in the Mid-Atlantic and Southeastern regions of the United States between the Atlantic Coast and the Appalachian Mountains. Its geography and climate are shaped by the Blue Ridge Mountains and the Chesapeake Bay. The state's capital is Richmond. Its most-populous city is Virginia Beach, and Fairfax County is the state's most-populous political subdivision. Virginia's population  was over 8.68million, with 35% living within in the Greater Washington metropolitan area.

Virginia's history begins with several indigenous groups, including the Powhatan. In 1607, the London Company established the Colony of Virginia as the first permanent English colony in the New World. Virginia's state nickname, the Old Dominion, is a reference to this status. Slave labor and land acquired from displaced native tribes fueled the growing plantation economy, but also fueled conflicts both inside and outside the colony. Virginia was one of the original Thirteen Colonies in the American Revolution, and several Revolutionary War battles were fought in in Virginia. During the American Civil War, Virginia was split when the state government in Richmond joined the Confederacy, but many of the state's northwestern counties remained loyal to the Union, separating as the state of West Virginia in 1863. Although the Commonwealth was under one-party rule for nearly a century following the Reconstruction era, both major political parties are competitive in modern Virginia.

Virginia's state legislature is the Virginia General Assembly, which was established in July 1619, making it the oldest current law-making body in North America. It is made up of a 40-member Senate and a 100-member House of Delegates. Unlike other states, cities and counties in Virginia function as equals, but the state government manages most local roads inside them. It is also the only state where governors are prohibited from serving consecutive terms. Virginia's economy is diverse with a strong agriculture industry in the Shenandoah Valley; high tech and federal agencies in Northern Virginia, including the headquarters of the U.S. Department of Defense and Central Intelligence Agency; and military facilities in Hampton Roads, the site of the region's main seaport.

History

May 2007 marked 400 years since the establishment of the Jamestown Colony. Observances for this quadricentennial recognized both the contributions from and conflicts between Native Americans, Europeans, and Africans, all of which had a meaningful part in shaping Virginia's ongoing history. This history includes events that were central to the larger French and Indian, Revolutionary, and Civil Wars, and significant to the Cold War, Afghanistan War, and the civil rights movement. Fictionalized stories about Virginia's history became very popular in the period after the Revolutionary War and turned into touchstones that helped shape the state's historic politics and beliefs as, despite historic inaccuracies, myths about Pocahontas and John Smith, George Washington's childhood, and the causes of the Civil War all became embedded in both the local and national cultures.

Original inhabitants 
The first people are estimated to have arrived in Virginia over 12,000 years ago. By 5,000 years ago, more permanent settlements emerged, and farming began by 900 AD. By 1500, the Algonquian peoples had founded towns such as Werowocomoco in the Tidewater region, which they referred to as Tsenacommacah. The other major language groups in the area were the Siouan to the west and the Iroquoians, who included the Nottoway and Meherrin, to the north and south. After 1570, the Algonquians consolidated under Wahunsenacawh, known in English as Chief Powhatan, in response to threats from these other groups on their trade network. Powhatan controlled more than thirty smaller tribes, which shared a common Virginia Algonquian language, with more than 150 settlements that had total population of around 15,000 in 1607. Over that century however, three-fourths of the native population in Virginia would die from smallpox and other Old World diseases.

Colony

Several European expeditions, including a group of Spanish Jesuits, explored the Chesapeake Bay during the 16th century. To help counter Spain's colonies in the Caribbean, Queen Elizabeth I of England supported Walter Raleigh's April 1584 expedition to the Atlantic coast of North America. The name "Virginia" was used by Captain Arthur Barlowe in the expedition's report, and may have been suggested that year by Raleigh or Elizabeth, perhaps noting her status as the "Virgin Queen" or that they viewed the land as being untouched, and may also be related to an Algonquin phrase, Wingandacoa or Windgancon, or leader's name, Wingina, as heard by the expedition. Initially the name applied to the entire coastal region from South Carolina to Maine, plus the island of Bermuda. Raleigh's colony failed, but in 1606, the new king James I of England issued the First Virginia Charter to the London Company, a joint stock company that financed a new expedition, which was led by Christopher Newport and sailed that December. They landed in May 1607, and established a settlement named for the king, Jamestown.

Life in the colony was perilous, and many died during the Starving Time in 1609 and in a series of conflicts with the Powhatan Confederacy that started in 1610, and flared up again in 1622, when led by Powhatan's brother, Opechancanough. Only 3,400 of the 6,000 early settlers had survived by 1624. However, European demand for tobacco fueled the arrival of more settlers and servants. The headright system tried to solve the labor shortage by providing colonists with land for each indentured servant they transported to Virginia. Colonists struggled against both the London Company and English monarchy, which took direct control of the colony in 1624 in part because in 1619, colonists had gained greater local control with an elected leadership. Later called the House of Burgesses, it shared power with the governors appointed by the crown. In 1635, colonists arrested a despised governor and forced him to return to England against his will. The turmoil of the English Civil War permitted Virginia even greater autonomy during the 1650s, and many supporters of the king fled to the colony, becoming known as "Virginia Cavaliers."

African workers were first imported to Jamestown in 1619 initially under the rules of indentured servitude. The shift to a system of African slavery in Virginia was propelled by the legal cases of John Punch, who was sentenced to lifetime slavery for attempting to escape servitude in 1640, and of John Casor, who was claimed by Anthony Johnson as his servant for life in 1655. Slavery first appears in Virginia statutes in 1661 and 1662, when a law made it hereditary based on the mother's status. Tensions and the geographic differences between the working and ruling classes led to Bacon's Rebellion in 1676, by which time current and former indentured servants made up as much as eighty percent of the population. The rebels, who burned Jamestown, were largely from the colony's frontier, and opposed to the governor's conciliatory policy towards native tribes. One result of the rebellion was the signing at Middle Plantation of the Treaty of 1677, which made the signatory tribes tributary states and was part of a pattern of appropriating tribal land by force and treaty.

In 1693, the College of William & Mary was founded in Middle Plantation, which was renamed Williamsburg in 1699, when it became the new capital of the growing colony. Colonists in the 1700s were likewise moving inland, and in 1747, a group of Virginian speculators formed the Ohio Company, with the backing of the British crown, to start English settlement and trade in the Ohio Country west of the Appalachian Mountains. The Kingdom of France, which claimed this area as part of their colony of New France, viewed this as a threat, and the ensuing French and Indian War became part of the Seven Years' War (1756–1763). A militia from several British colonies, called the Virginia Regiment, was led by then-Lieutenant Colonel George Washington.

Statehood

The British Parliament's efforts to levy new taxes in the decade following the French and Indian War were deeply unpopular in the colonies. In the House of Burgesses, opposition to taxation without representation was led by Patrick Henry and Richard Henry Lee, among others. Virginians began to coordinate their actions with other colonies in 1773, and sent delegates to the Continental Congress the following year. After the House of Burgesses was dissolved by the British governor in 1774, Virginia's revolutionary leaders continued to govern via the Virginia Conventions. On May 15, 1776, the Convention declared Virginia's independence from the British Empire and adopted George Mason's Virginia Declaration of Rights, which was then included in a new constitution. Another Virginian, Thomas Jefferson, drew upon Mason's work in drafting the national Declaration of Independence.

After the American Revolutionary War began in 1776, George Washington was selected by the Second Continental Congress in Philadelphia to head the Continental Army, and many Virginians joined the army and other revolutionary militias. Virginia was the first colony to ratify the Articles of Confederation in December 1777. In April 1780, the capital was moved to Richmond at the urging of Governor Thomas Jefferson, who feared that Williamsburg's coastal location would make it vulnerable to British attack. British forces indeed landed around Portsmouth in October 1780, and soldiers under Benedict Arnold managed to raid Richmond in January 1781. The British army had over seven thousand soldiers and twenty-five warships stationed in Virginia at the beginning of 1781, but General Charles Cornwallis and his superiors were indecisive, and maneuvers by the three thousand soldiers under the Marquis de Lafayette and twenty-nine allied French warships together managed to trap the British on the Virginia Peninsula in September. Around sixteen thousand soldiers under George Washington and Comte de Rochambeau quickly converged there and defeated Cornwallis in the siege of Yorktown. His surrender on October 19, 1781, led to peace negotiations in Paris and secured the independence of the colonies.

Virginians were instrumental in the new country's early years and in writing the United States Constitution. James Madison drafted the Virginia Plan in 1787 and the Bill of Rights in 1789. Virginia ratified the Constitution on June 25, 1788. The three-fifths compromise ensured that Virginia, with its large number of slaves, initially had the largest bloc in the House of Representatives. Together with the Virginia dynasty of presidents, this gave the Commonwealth national importance. In 1790, both Virginia and Maryland ceded territory to form the new District of Columbia, though the Virginian area was retroceded in 1846. Virginia is called the "Mother of States" because of its role in being carved into states such as Kentucky, which became the fifteenth state in 1792, and for the numbers of American pioneers born in Virginia.

Civil War

Between 1790 and 1860, the number of slaves in Virginia rose from around 290 thousand to over 490 thousand, roughly one-third of the state population during that time, and the number of slaveholders rose to over fifty thousand, both the most in the U.S. Soil exhausted by years of monoculture tobacco farming pushed the plantation economy to expand westward, and as labor-intensive cotton came to dominate southern agriculture after 1800, Virginia plantations turned to exporting slaves by the thousands, breaking up many families in the process and making the breeding of slaves, often through rape, a profitable business for their owners, especially as new federal laws restricted the importation of slaves from abroad. In addition to agriculture, slave labor was increasingly used in mining, shipbuilding, and other industrial jobs. The failed slave uprisings of Gabriel Prosser in 1800, George Boxley in 1815, and Nat Turner in 1831, however, marked the growing resistance to the system of slavery. Afraid of further uprisings, Virginia's government in the 1830s encouraged free Blacks to migrate to Liberia.

On October 16, 1859, abolitionist John Brown led a raid on an armory in Harpers Ferry, Virginia, in an attempt to start a slave revolt across the southern states. The polarized national response to his raid, capture, trial, and execution in Charles Town that December marked a tipping point for many who believed the end of slavery would need to be achieved by force. Abraham Lincoln's 1860 election further convinced many southern supporters of slavery that his opposition to its expansion would ultimately mean the end of slavery across the country. In South Carolina, the first state to secede to preserve the institution of slavery, a regiment loyal to the newly-formed Confederate States of America seized Fort Sumter on April 14, 1861, prompting President Lincoln to call for a federal army of 75,000 men from state militias the next day.

In Virginia, a special convention called by the General Assembly voted on April 17 to secede on the condition it was approved in a referendum the next month. The convention then voted to join the Confederacy, which named Richmond its capital on May 20. During the May 23 referendum, armed pro-Confederate groups prevented the casting and counting of votes from many northwestern counties that opposed secession. Representatives from 27 of these counties instead began the Wheeling Convention that month, which organized a government loyal to the Union and led to the separation of West Virginia as a new state.

The armies of the Union and Confederacy first met on July 21, 1861 in Battle of Bull Run near Manassas, Virginia, where a Confederate victory established that the war would not be easily decided. Union General George B. McClellan organized the Army of the Potomac, which landed on the Virginia Peninsula in March 1862 and reached the outskirts of Richmond that June. With Confederate General Joseph E. Johnston wounded in fighting outside the city, command his Army of Northern Virginia fell to Robert E. Lee. Over the next month, Lee drove the Union army back, and starting that September, led the first of several invasions into Union territory. During the next three years of war, more battles were fought in Virginia than anywhere else, including the battles of Fredericksburg, Chancellorsville, Spotsylvania, and the concluding Battle of Appomattox Court House, where Lee surrendered on April 9, 1865. After the capture of Richmond that month, the state capital was briefly moved to Lynchburg, while the Confederate leadership fled to Danville. 32,751 Virginians died in the Civil War.

Reconstruction and Jim Crow

Virginia was formally restored to the United States in 1870, due to the work of the Committee of Nine. During the post-war Reconstruction era, African Americans were able to unite in communities, particularly around Richmond, Danville, and the Tidewater region, and take a greater role in Virginia society, as many achieved some land ownership during the 1870s. Virginia adopted a constitution in 1868 which guaranteed political, civil, and voting rights, and provided for free public schools. However, with many railroad lines and other infrastructure investments destroyed during the Civil War, the Commonwealth was deeply in debt, and in the late 1870s redirected money from public schools to pay bondholders. The Readjuster Party formed in 1877 and won legislative power in 1879 by uniting Black and white Virginians behind a shared opposition to debt payments and the perceived plantation elites.

The Readjusters focused on building up schools, like Virginia Tech and Virginia State, and successfully forced West Virginia to share in the pre-war debt. But in 1883, they were divided by a proposed repeal of anti-miscegenation laws, and days before that year's election, a riot in Danville, involving armed policemen, left four Black men and one white man dead. These events motivated a push by white supremacists to seize political power through voter suppression, and segregationists in the Democratic Party won the legislature that year and maintained control for decades. They passed Jim Crow laws and in 1902 rewrote the state constitution to include a poll tax and other voter registration measures that effectively disenfranchised most African Americans and many poor whites.

New economic forces would meanwhile industrialize the Commonwealth. Virginian James Albert Bonsack invented the tobacco cigarette rolling machine in 1880 leading to new large-scale production centered around Richmond. Railroad magnate Collis Potter Huntington founded Newport News Shipbuilding in 1886, which was responsible for building six World War I-era dreadnoughts, seven battleships, and 25 destroyers for the U.S. Navy from 1907 to 1923. During the war, German submarines like U-151 attacked ships outside the port, which was a major site for transportation of both soldiers and supplies. A homecoming parade to honor African-American veterans returning from the war was attacked in July 1919 as part of a renewed white-supremacy movement that was known as Red Summer. During World War II, the shipyard quadrupled its labor force to 70,000 by 1943, while the Radford Arsenal outside Blacksburg had 22,000 workers making explosives.

Civil rights to present

Protests against underfunded segregated schools started by Barbara Rose Johns in 1951 in Farmville led to the lawsuit Davis v. County School Board of Prince Edward County. This case, filed by Richmond natives Spottswood Robinson and Oliver Hill, was decided in 1954 with Brown v. Board of Education, which rejected the doctrine of "separate but equal". But, in 1956, under the policy of "massive resistance" led by the influential segregationist Senator Harry F. Byrd and his Byrd Organization, the Commonwealth prohibited desegregated local schools from receiving state or private funding as part of the Stanley Plan. After schools in many districts began closing in September 1958, state and district courts ruled the plan unconstitutional, and on February 2, 1959, the first Black students integrated schools in Arlington and Norfolk, where they were known as the Norfolk 17. Prince Edward County still refused to integrate, and closed their county school system in June 1959. The Supreme Court ordered the county's public schools to be, like others in the state, open and integrated in May 1964, which they finally did that September.

The civil rights movement gained national support during the 1960s. Federal passage of the Civil Rights Act in June 1964 and Voting Rights Act in August 1965, and their later enforcement, helped end racial segregation in Virginia and overturn Jim Crow era state laws. In June 1967, the Supreme Court also struck down the state's ban on interracial marriage with Loving v. Virginia. In 1968, Governor Mills Godwin called a commission to rewrite the state constitution. The new constitution, which banned discrimination and removed articles which now violated federal law, passed in a referendum with 71.8% support and went into effect in June 1971. In 1977, Black members became the majority of Richmond's city council; in 1989, Douglas Wilder became the first African American elected as governor in the United States; and in 1992, Bobby Scott became the first Black congressman from Virginia since 1888.

The expansion of federal government offices into Northern Virginia's suburbs during the Cold War boosted the region's population and economy. The Central Intelligence Agency outgrew their offices in Foggy Bottom during the Korean War, and moved to Langley in 1961, in part due to a decision by the National Security Council that the agency relocate outside the District of Columbia. The agency was involved in various Cold War events, and its headquarters was a target of Soviet espionage activities. The Pentagon, built in Arlington during World War II as the headquarters of the Department of Defense, was one of the targets of the September 11, 2001 attacks; 189 people died at the site when a jet passenger plane was flown into the building. Mass shootings at Virginia Tech in 2007 and in Virginia Beach in 2019 led to passage of gun control measures in 2020. Racial injustice and the presence of Confederate monuments in Virginia have also led to large demonstrations, including in August 2017, when a white supremacist drove his car into protesters, killing one, and in June 2020, when protests that were part of the larger Black Lives Matter movement brought about the removal of statues on Monument Avenue in Richmond and elsewhere.

Geography

Virginia is located in the Mid-Atlantic and Southeastern regions of the United States. The Commonwealth is bordered by Maryland and Washington, D.C. to the north and east; by the Atlantic Ocean to the east; by North Carolina to the south; by Tennessee to the southwest; by Kentucky to the west; and by West Virginia to the north and west. Virginia's boundary with Maryland and Washington, D.C. extends to the low-water mark of the south shore of the Potomac River.

The Commonwealth's southern border is defined as 36°30' north latitude, though surveyor error in the 1700s led to deviations of as much as three arcminutes as the North Carolina border moved west. Surveyors appointed by Virginia and Tennessee worked in 1802 and 1803 to reset the border as a line from the summit of White Top Mountain to the top of Tri-State Peak in the Cumberland Mountains. However, errors in this line were discovered in 1856, and the Virginia General Assembly proposed a new surveying commission in 1871. Tennessee's representatives preferred to keep the 1803 line, and in 1893, the U.S. Supreme Court ruled in their state's favor in the case Virginia v. Tennessee. One result of this is the division of the city of Bristol between the two states.

Geology and terrain

The Chesapeake Bay separates the contiguous portion of the Commonwealth from the two-county peninsula of Virginia's Eastern Shore. The bay was formed from the drowned river valley of the ancient Susquehanna River. Many of Virginia's rivers flow into the Chesapeake Bay, including the Potomac, Rappahannock, York, and James, which create three peninsulas in the bay, traditionally referred to as "necks" named Northern Neck, Middle Peninsula, and the Virginia Peninsula from north to south. Sea level rise has eroded the land on Virginia's islands, which include Tangier Island in the bay and Chincoteague, one of 23 barrier islands on the Atlantic coast.

The Tidewater is a coastal plain between the Atlantic coast and the fall line. It includes the Eastern Shore and major estuaries of Chesapeake Bay. The Piedmont is a series of sedimentary and igneous rock-based foothills east of the mountains which were formed in the Mesozoic era. The region, known for its heavy clay soil, includes the Southwest Mountains around Charlottesville. The Ridge-and-Valley region is west of the mountains, carbonate rock based, and includes the Massanutten Mountain ridge and the Great Appalachian Valley, which is called the Shenandoah Valley in Virginia. The Cumberland Plateau and Cumberland Mountains are in the southwest corner of Virginia, south of the Allegheny Plateau. In this region, rivers flow northwest, with a dendritic drainage system, into the Ohio River basin.

The Virginia Seismic Zone has not had a history of regular earthquake activity. Earthquakes are rarely above 4.5 in magnitude, because Virginia is located away from the edges of the North American Plate. The Commonwealth's largest earthquake in at least a century, at a magnitude of 5.8, struck central Virginia on August 23, 2011, near Mineral. Due to the area's geologic properties, this earthquake was felt from Northern Florida to Southern Ontario. 35million years ago, a bolide impacted what is now eastern Virginia. The resulting Chesapeake Bay impact crater may explain what earthquakes and subsidence the region does experience. A meteor impact is also theorized as the source of Lake Drummond, the largest of the two natural lakes in the state.

The Commonwealth's carbonate rock is filled with more than 4,000 limestone caves, ten of which are open for tourism, including the popular Luray Caverns and Skyline Caverns. Virginia's iconic Natural Bridge is also the remaining roof of a collapsed limestone cave. Coal mining takes place in the three mountainous regions at 45 distinct coal beds near Mesozoic basins. More than 72million tons of other non-fuel resources, such as slate, kyanite, sand, or gravel, were also mined in Virginia . The largest-known deposits of uranium in the U.S. are under Coles Hill, Virginia. Despite a challenge that reached the U.S. Supreme Court twice, the state has banned its mining since 1982 due to environmental and public health concerns.

Climate

Virginia has a humid subtropical climate that transitions to humid continental west of the Blue Ridge Mountains. The Atlantic Ocean and Gulf Stream have a strong effect on eastern and southeastern coastal areas of the Commonwealth, making the climate there warmer and more constant. Most of Virginia's recorded extremes in temperature and precipitation have occurred in the Blue Ridge Mountains and areas west.

Virginia has around 35–45 days with thunderstorms annually, and storms are common in the late afternoon and evenings between April and September. These months are also the most common for tornadoes, sixteen of which touched down in the Commonwealth in 2022. Hurricanes and tropical storms can occur from August to October, and though they typically impact coastal regions, the deadliest natural disaster in Virginia was Hurricane Camille, which killed over 150 people mainly in inland Nelson County in 1969. Between December and March, cold-air damming caused by the Appalachian Mountains can lead to significant snowfalls across the state, such as the January 2016 blizzard, which created the state's highest recorded snowfall of  near Bluemont.

Part of this is due to climate change in Virginia, which is leading to higher temperatures year-round as well as more heavy rain and flooding events. Urban heat islands can be found in many Virginia cities and suburbs, particularly in neighborhoods linked to historic redlining. Arlington had the most code orange days in 2021 for high ozone pollution in the air, with four, followed by Fairfax County with three. The closure and conversion of coal power plants in Virginia and the Ohio Valley region has reduced haze in the mountains, which peaked in 1998. Exposure of particulate matter in Virginia's air has been cut in half from 13.5 micrograms per cubic meter in 2003, when coal provided half of Virginia's electricity, to 6.6 in 2022, when coal provided just 3.3%, less than renewables like solar power and biomass. Current plans call for 30% of the Commonwealth's electricity to be renewable by 2030 and for all to be carbon-free by 2050.

Ecosystem

Forests cover 62% of Virginia , of which 80% is considered hardwood forest, meaning that trees in Virginia are primarily deciduous and broad-leaved. The other 20% is pine, with Loblolly and shortleaf pine dominating much of central and eastern Virginia. In the western and mountainous parts of the Commonwealth, oak and hickory are most common, while lower altitudes are more likely to have small but dense stands of moisture-loving hemlocks and mosses in abundance. Spongy moth infestations in oak trees and the blight in chestnut trees have decreased both of their numbers, leaving more room for hickory and invasive ailanthus trees. In the lowland tidewater and Piedmont, yellow pines tend to dominate, with bald cypress wetland forests in the Great Dismal and Nottoway swamps. Other common trees include red spruce, Atlantic White cedar, tulip-poplar, and the flowering dogwood, the state tree and flower, as well as willows, ashes, and laurels. Plants like milkweed, dandelions, daisies, ferns, and Virginia creeper, which is featured on the state flag, are also common. The Thompson Wildlife Area in Fauquier is known for having one of the largest populations of trillium wildflowers in all of North America.

White-tailed deer, one of 75 mammal species found in Virginia, rebounded from an estimated population of as few as 25 thousand in the 1930s to over one million by the 2010s. Native carnivorans include black bears, who have a population of around five to six thousand in the state, as well as bobcats, coyotes, both gray and red foxes, raccoons, weasels and skunks. Rodents include groundhogs, nutria, beavers, both gray squirrels and fox squirrels, chipmunks, and Allegheny woodrats, while the seventeen bat species include brown bats and the Virginia big-eared bat, the state mammal. The Virginia opossum is also the only marsupial native to the United States and Canada, and the native Appalachian cottontail was recognized in 1992 as a distinct species of rabbit, one of three found in the state. Whales, dolphins, and porpoises have also been recorded in Virginia's coastal waters, with bottlenose dolphins being the most frequent aquatic mammals.

Virginia's bird fauna consists of 422 counted species, of which 359 are regularly occurring, 41 are accidental (vagrant), 20 are hypothetical, and two are extinct; of the regularly occurring species, 214 have bred in Virginia, while the rest are winter residents or transients in Virginia. Water birds include sandpipers, wood ducks, and Virginia rail, while common inland examples include warblers, woodpeckers, and cardinals, the state bird. Birds of prey include osprey, broad-winged hawks, and barred owls. There are no species of bird endemic to the Commonwealth. Audubon recognizes 21 Important Bird Areas in the state. Peregrine falcons, whose numbers dramatically declined due to DDT pesticide poisoning in the middle of the 20th century, are the focus of conservation efforts in the state and a reintroduction program in Shenandoah National Park.

Virginia has 226 species of freshwater fish from 25 families; the state's diverse array of fish species is attributable to its varied and humid climate, topography, interconnected river system, and lack of Pleistocene glaciers. The state's lakes and rivers are home to Eastern blacknose dace and sculpin on the Appalachian Plateau; smallmouth bass and redhorse sucker in the Ridge-and-Valley region; brook trout, the state fish, and Kanawha darter in the Blue Ridge; stripeback darter and Roanoke bass in the Piedmont; and swampfish, bluespotted sunfish, and pirate perch in the Tidewater. The Chesapeake Bay is host to clams, oysters, and 350 species of saltwater and estuarine fish, including the bay's most abundant finfish, the Bay anchovy, as well as the invasive blue catfish. An estimated 405 million Chesapeake blue crabs live in the bay . There are 34 native species of crayfish, like the Big Sandy, which often inhabit rocky bottomed streambeds. Amphibians found in Virginia include the Cumberland Plateau salamander and Eastern hellbender, while the northern watersnake is the most common of the 32 snake species.

Protected lands 

, roughly 16.2% of land in the Commonwealth is protected by federal, state, and local governments and non-profits. Federal lands account for the majority, with thirty National Park Service units in the state, such as Great Falls Park and the Appalachian Trail, and one national park, Shenandoah. Shenandoah was established in 1935 and encompasses the scenic Skyline Drive. Almost forty percent of the park's total  area has been designated as wilderness under the National Wilderness Preservation System. The U.S. Forest Service administers the George Washington and Jefferson National Forests, which cover more than  within Virginia's mountains, and continue into West Virginia and Kentucky. The Great Dismal Swamp National Wildlife Refuge also extends into North Carolina, as does the Back Bay National Wildlife Refuge, which marks the beginning of the Outer Banks.

Breaks Interstate Park crosses the Kentucky border and is one of only two inter-state parks in the United States. The Chesapeake Bay is not a national park, but is protected by both state and federal legislation and the inter-state Chesapeake Bay Program, which conducts restoration on the bay and its watershed.

Cities and towns

Virginia is divided into 95counties and 38independent cities, which the U.S. Census Bureau describes as county-equivalents. This general method of treating cities and counties on par with each other is unique to Virginia, and stretches back the influence the city of Williamsburg had in the colonial period. Only three other independent cities exist elsewhere in the United States, each in a different state. The differences between counties and cities in Virginia are small and have to do with how each assess new taxes, whether a referendum is necessary to issue bonds, and with the application of Dillon's Rule, which limits the authority of cities and counties to countermand acts expressly allowed by the General Assembly. Within counties, there can also be incorporated towns, which do operate their own governments, and unincorporated communities, which do not. There are no further administrative subdivisions, such as villages or townships.

Over three million people, 35% of Virginians, live in the twenty jurisdictions defined as Northern Virginia, which is part of the larger Washington metropolitan area and the Northeast megalopolis. Fairfax County, with more than 1.1million residents, is the most populous jurisdiction, and has a major urban business and shopping center in Tysons, Virginia's largest office market. Neighboring Prince William County is Virginia's second most populous county, with a population exceeding 450,000, and is home to Marine Corps Base Quantico, the FBI Academy and Manassas National Battlefield Park. Loudoun County, with its county seat at Leesburg, is the fastest-growing county in the state. Arlington County is the smallest self-governing county in the U.S. by land area, and has considered reorganizing as an independent city due to its high density.

Richmond is the capital of Virginia, and its city proper has a population of over 230,000, while its metropolitan area has over 1.3million. , Virginia Beach is the most populous independent city in the Commonwealth, with Chesapeake and Norfolk second and third, respectively. The three are part of the larger Hampton Roads metropolitan area, which has a population over 1.7million people and is the site of the world's largest naval base, Naval Station Norfolk. In western Virginia, Roanoke city and Montgomery County, part of the Blacksburg–Christiansburg metropolitan area, both have surpassed a population of over 100,000 since 2018.

Demographics

The U.S. Census Bureau found the state resident population was 8,631,393 on April 1, 2020, a 7.9% increase since the 2010 census. Another 23,149 Virginians live overseas, giving the state a total population of 8,654,542. Virginia has the fourth largest overseas population of U.S. states due to its federal employees and military personnel. The fertility rate in Virginia  was 55.8 per 1,000 females between the ages of 15 and 44, and the median age  was the same as the national average of 38.8 years old, with the oldest city by median age being James City and the youngest being Lynchburg, home to several universities. The geographic center of population was located northwest of Richmond in Hanover County, .

Though still growing naturally as births outnumber deaths, Virginia has had a negative net migration rate since 2013, with 8,995 more people leaving the state than moving to it in 2021. This is largely credited to high home prices in Northern Virginia, which are driving residents there to relocate south, and although Raleigh is their top destination, in-state migration from Northern Virginia to Richmond increased by 36% in 2020 and 2021 compared to the annual average over the previous decade. Aside from Virginia, the top birth state for Virginians is New York, having overtaken North Carolina in the 1990s, with the Northeast accounting for the largest number of domestic migrants into the state by region. About twelve percent of residents were born outside the United States . El Salvador is the most common foreign country of birth, with India, South Korea, Vietnam, Ethiopia, and the Philippines as other common birthplaces.

Race and ethnicity

The state's most populous racial group, non-Hispanic whites, has declined as a proportion of the population from 76% in 1990 to 58.6% in 2020, as other ethnicities have increased. Immigrants from the islands of Britain and Ireland settled throughout the Commonwealth during the colonial period, a time when roughly three-fourths of immigrants came as indentured servants. Those who identify on the census as having "American ethnicity" are predominantly of English descent, but have ancestors who have been in North America for so long they choose to identify simply as American. The western mountains have many settlements that were founded by Scotch-Irish immigrants before the American Revolution. There are also sizable numbers of people of German descent in the northwestern mountains and Shenandoah Valley, and 10.3% of Virginians are estimated to have German ancestry, .

The largest minority group in Virginia are Blacks and African Americans, who include about one-fifth of the population. Virginia was a major destination of the Atlantic slave trade, and the first generations of enslaved men, women, and children were brought primarily from Angola and the Bight of Biafra. The Igbo ethnic group of what is now southern Nigeria were the single largest African group among slaves in Virginia. Blacks in Virginia also have more European ancestry than those in other southern states, and DNA analysis shows many have asymmetrical male and female ancestry contributions from before the Civil War, evidence of European fathers and African or Native American mothers during the time of slavery. Though the Black population was reduced by the Great Migration to northern industrial cities in the first half of the 20th century, since 1965 there has been a reverse migration of Blacks returning south. The Commonwealth has the highest number of Black-white interracial marriages in the United States, and 8.2% of Virginians describe themselves as multiracial.

More recent immigration in the late 20th century and early 21st century has resulted in new communities of Hispanics and Asians. , 10.5% of Virginia's total population describe themselves as Hispanic or Latino, and 8.8% as Asian. The state's Hispanic population rose by 92% from 2000 to 2010, with two-thirds of Hispanics in the state living in Northern Virginia. Northern Virginia also has a significant population of Vietnamese Americans, whose major wave of immigration followed the Vietnam War. Korean Americans have migrated more recently, attracted by the quality school system. The Filipino American community has about 45,000 in the Hampton Roads area, many of whom have ties to the U.S. Navy and armed forces.

Tribal membership in Virginia is complicated by the legacy of the state's "pencil genocide" of intentionally categorizing Native Americans and Blacks together, and many tribal members do have African and European ancestry. In 2020, the U.S. Census Bureau found that only 0.5% of Virginians were exclusively American Indian or Alaska Native, though 2.1% were in some combination with other ethnicities. The state government has extended recognition to eleven indigenous tribes resident in Virginia. Seven tribes also have federal recognition, including six that were recognized in 2018 after passage of bill named for activist Thomasina Jordan. The Pamunkey and Mattaponi have reservations on tributaries of the York River in the Tidewater region.

Languages

According to U.S. Census data  on Virginia residents age five and older, 83.2% (6,683,027) speak English at home as a first language, while 16.8% (1,352,586) speak something other than English. Spanish is the next most commonly spoken language, with 7.6% (616,226) of Virginia households, though age is a factor, and 10.3% (139,312) of Virginians under age eighteen speak Spanish. 58.2% of Spanish speakers reported speaking English "very well," but again, of Spanish-speakers under age eighteen, 80.3% speak English "very well." Chinese languages, including Standard Mandarin and Cantonese, were the third most commonly spoken languages with around 0.8% of residents, followed by Vietnamese and Arabic, both with just over 0.7%, and then Korean and Tagalog, with 0.6% and 0.5% respectively.

English was passed as the Commonwealth's official language by statutes in 1981 and again in 1996, though the status is not mandated by the Constitution of Virginia. While a more homogenized American English is found in urban areas, various accents are also used. The Piedmont region is known for its non-rhotic dialect's strong influence on Southern American English, and a BBC America study in 2014 ranked it as one of the most identifiable accents in American English. The Tidewater accent, sometimes described as a subset of the Old Virginia accent, evolved from the language that upper-class English typically spoke in the early Colonial period, while the Appalachian accent has much more influence from the English spoken by Scottish and Irish immigrants from that time. The English spoken on Tangier Island in the Chesapeake Bay, preserved by the island's isolation, contains many phrases and euphemisms not found anywhere else and is said to closely resemble Elizabethan English or "Restoration English."

Religion

Virginia is predominantly Christian and Protestant; Baptist denominations combined to form largest group with over a quarter of the population . Baptist denominational groups in Virginia include the Baptist General Association of Virginia, with about 1,400 member churches, which supports both the Southern Baptist Convention and the moderate Cooperative Baptist Fellowship; and the Southern Baptist Conservatives of Virginia with more than 500 affiliated churches, which supports the Southern Baptist Convention. Roman Catholics are the next largest religious group with around twelve percent. The Roman Catholic Diocese of Arlington includes most of Northern Virginia's Catholic churches, while the Diocese of Richmond covers the rest of the state.

The United Methodist Church, representing about six percent of Virginians, has the Virginia Conference as their regional body in most of the Commonwealth, while the Holston Conference represents much of extreme Southwest Virginia. Around five percent of Virginians attend Pentecostal churches, while around three percent attend Presbyterian churches, which are split between the Presbyterian Church (USA) and the Presbyterian Church in America. The Lutheran Church, under the Virginia Synod, Congregational churches, and Episcopalian adherents each comprised less than two percent of the population . The Episcopal Diocese of Virginia, Southern Virginia, and Southwestern Virginia support the various Episcopal churches.

In November 2006, fifteen conservative Episcopal churches voted to split from the Diocese of Virginia over the ordination of openly gay bishops and clergy in other dioceses of the Episcopal Church; these churches continue to claim affiliation with the larger Anglican Communion through other bodies outside the United States. Though Virginia law allows parishioners to determine their church's affiliation, the diocese claimed the secessionist churches' buildings and properties. The resulting property law case, ultimately decided in favor of the mainline diocese, was a test for Episcopal churches nationwide.

Among other religions, adherents of the Church of Jesus Christ of Latter-day Saints constitute just over one percent of the population, with 216 congregations in Virginia . Fairfax Station is the site of the Ekoji Buddhist Temple, of the Jodo Shinshu school, and the Hindu Durga Temple. Sterling is the home of the All Dulles Area Muslim Society, which, with its eleven satellite branches, considers itself the second largest Muslim mosque community in the country. While the state's Jewish population is small, organized Jewish sites date to 1789 with Congregation Beth Ahabah. Megachurches in the Commonwealth include Thomas Road Baptist Church, Immanuel Bible Church, and McLean Bible Church, and the twenty percent who describe themselves as unaffiliated also include seven percent who say religion is important to them, but may not attend regular services with formal membership. Several Christian universities are also based in the state, including Regent University, Liberty University, and the University of Lynchburg.

Economy

Virginia's economy has diverse sources of income, including local and federal government, military, farming and high-tech. The state's average per capita income was $66,305 in 2021, the 12th-highest nationwide, and the gross domestic product (GDP) was $654.5billion in 2022, the 13th-largest among U.S. states. Prior to the COVID-19 recession, in March 2020, Virginia had 4.36million people employed with an unemployment rate of 2.9%, but jobless claims due to the virus soared over 10% in early April 2020, before leaving off around 5% in November 2020. In January 2023, it was 3.2%, which was the 23rd-lowest nationwide.

Virginia had a median household income of $80,615 in 2021, 11th-highest nationwide, and a poverty rate of 10.2%, 10th-lowest nationwide. Montgomery County outside Blacksburg has the highest poverty rate in the state, with 28.5% falling below the U.S. Census poverty thresholds. The Hampton Roads region has the state's highest per capita number of homeless individuals, with 11 per 10,000, . Loudoun County meanwhile has the highest median household income in the nation, and the wider Northern Virginia region is among the highest-income regions nationwide. , seven of the twenty-five highest-income counties in the United States, including the two highest, are located in Northern Virginia. Though the Gini index shows Virginia has less income inequality than the national average, the state's middle class is also smaller than the majority of states.

Virginia's business environment has been ranked highly by various publications. After two years as number one, CNBC ranked Virginia third in their 2022 Top States for Business, with its deductions being mainly for the high cost of living, while Forbes magazine ranked it as the eighteenth best to start a business in. Additionally, in 2014 a survey of 12,000 small business owners found Virginia to be one of the most friendly states for small businesses. Oxfam America however ranked Virginia  as only the 22nd-best state to work in, with pluses for new worker protections from sexual harassment and pregnancy discrimination, but negatives for laws on organized labor and the low tipped employee minimum wage of $2.13. Virginia has been an employment-at-will state since 1906 and a "right to work" state since 1947, and though state minimum wage increased to $12 in 2023, farm and tipped workers are specifically excluded.

Government agencies

Government agencies directly employ around 714,100 Virginians , almost 17% of all employees in the state. Approximately 12% of all U.S. federal procurement money is spent in Virginia, the second-highest amount after California. , 125,648 active-duty personnel, 25,404 reservists, and 99,832 civilians work directly for the U.S. Department of Defense at the Pentagon or one of 27 military bases in the state, representing all major branches and covering . Another 139,000 Virginians work for defense contracting firms, which received $44.8 billion worth of contracts in the 2020 fiscal year. Virginia has the second highest concentration of veterans of any state with 9.7% of the population, as many stay in the state and the Hampton Roads area in particular, which is home to world's largest navy base and only NATO station on U.S. soil.

Other large federal agencies in Northern Virginia include the Central Intelligence Agency in Langley, the National Science Foundation and U.S. Patent and Trademark Office in Alexandria, the U.S. Geological Survey in Reston, and the U.S. Fish & Wildlife Service in Bailey's Crossroads. Virginia's state government employs over 106,000 public employees, who combined have a median income of $52,401 , with the Departments of Education and of Transportation being the largest by expenditure.

Business

Based on data , Virginia is home to 204,131 separate employers plus 644,341 sole proprietorships. Of the 144,431 registered non-farm businesses , 59.4% are majority male-owned, 22% are majority female-owned, 19.6% are majority minority-owned, and 8.9% are veteran-owned. Twenty-one Fortune 500 companies are headquartered in Virginia , with the largest companies by revenue being Freddie Mac, General Dynamics, Northrup Grumman, and Capital One. The largest by their number of employees are Dollar Tree in Chesapeake and Hilton Worldwide Holdings in McLean.

Virginia has the third highest concentration of technology workers and the fifth highest overall number among U.S. states , with the 451,268 tech jobs accounting for 11.1% of all jobs in the state and earning a median salary of $98,292. Many of these jobs are in Northern Virginia, which hosts a large number of software, communications, and cybersecurity companies, particularly in the Dulles Technology Corridor and Tysons Corner areas. Amazon additionally selected Crystal City for its HQ2 in 2018, while Google expanded their Reston offices in 2019.

Data centers in Virginia handled around one-third of all internet traffic and directly employed 13,500 Virginians in 2023 and supported 45,000 total jobs. In 2022, the state ranked fourth for fastest average internet download speeds in the United States, with 139.6 Mbit/s, and seventh in the percent of households with broadband access, at 92.9%. Computer chips first became the state's highest-grossing export in 2006, and had an estimated export value of $740million in 2022. Though in the top quartile for diversity based on the Simpson index, only 26% of tech employees in Virginia are women, and only 13% are Black or African American.

Tourism in Virginia supported an estimated 234,000 jobs in 2018, making tourism the state's fifth largest industry. It generated $26billion, an increase of 4.4% from 2017. The state was eighth nationwide in domestic travel spending in 2018, with Arlington County the top tourist destination in the state by domestic spending, followed by Fairfax County, Loudoun County, and Virginia Beach. Virginia also saw 1.1million international tourists in 2018, a five percent increase from 2017.

Agriculture

, agriculture occupied 28% of the land in Virginia with 7.8million acres (12,188 sq mi; 31,565 km2) of farmland. Nearly 54,000 Virginians work on the state's 43,225 farms, which average . Though agriculture has declined significantly since 1960 when there were twice as many farms, it remains the largest single industry in Virginia, providing for over 334,000 jobs. Soybeans were the most profitable single crop in Virginia in 2021, ahead of corn and cut flowers as other leading agricultural products. However, the ongoing China-U.S. trade war led many Virginia farmers to plant cotton instead of soybeans in 2019. Though it is no longer the primary crop, Virginia is still the third-largest producer of tobacco in the United States.

Virginia is also the country's third-largest producer of seafood , with sea scallops, oysters, Chesapeake blue crabs, menhaden, and hardshell clams as the largest seafood harvests by value, and France, Canada, and Hong Kong as the top export destinations. Commercial fishing supports 18,220 jobs , while recreation fishing supports another 5,893. Eastern oyster harvests had increased from 23,000 bushels in 2001 to over 500,000 in 2013, but fell to 248,347 in 2019 because of low salinity in coastal waters due to heavy spring rains. Those same rains however made 2019 a record wine harvest for vineyards in the Northern Neck and along the Blue Ridge Mountains, which also attract 2.3million tourists annually. Virginia has the seventh-highest number of wineries in the nation, with 356 producing 1.1 million cases a year . Cabernet franc and Chardonnay are the most grown varieties.

Taxes
State income tax is collected from those with incomes above a filing threshold; there are five income brackets, with rates ranging from 2.0% to 5.75% of taxable income. The state sales and use tax rate is 4.3%. There is an additional 1% local tax, for a total of a 5.3% combined sales tax on most Virginia purchases. The sales tax rate is higher in three regions: Northern Virginia (6%), Hampton Roads (6%) and the Historic Triangle (7%). Unlike the majority of states, Virginia has a sales tax on groceries, but at a lower rate than the general sales tax. The sales tax for food and certain essential personal hygiene goods was lowered to 1% in January 2023.

Virginia's property tax is set and collected at the local government level and varies throughout the Commonwealth. Real estate is also taxed at the local level based on one hundred percent of fair market value. As of fiscal year 2018, the median real estate tax rate per $100 of assessed taxable value was $1.07 for cities, $0.67 for counties, and $0.17 for towns; town rates are lower because towns (unlike cities) have a narrow range of responsibilities and are subordinate to counties. Of local government tax revenue, about 61% is generated from real property taxes; about 24% from tangible personal property, sales and use, and business license tax; and 15% from other taxes (such as restaurant meal taxes, public service corporation property tax, consumer utility tax, and hotel tax).

Culture

Modern Virginian culture has many sources, and is part of the culture of the Southern United States. The Smithsonian Institution divides Virginia into nine cultural regions, and in 2007 used their annual Folklife Festival to recognize the substantial contributions of England and Senegal on Virginian culture. Virginia's culture was popularized and spread across America and the South by figures such as George Washington, Thomas Jefferson, and Robert E. Lee. Their homes in Virginia represent the birthplace of America and the South.

Besides the general cuisine of the Southern United States, Virginians maintain their own particular traditions. Virginia wine is made in many parts of the Commonwealth. Smithfield ham, sometimes called "Virginia ham", is a type of country ham which is protected by state law, and can be produced only in the town of Smithfield. Virginia furniture and architecture are typical of American colonial architecture. Thomas Jefferson and many of the Commonwealth's early leaders favored the Neoclassical architecture style, leading to its use for important state buildings. The Pennsylvania Dutch and their style can also be found in parts of the Commonwealth.

Literature in Virginia often deals with the Commonwealth's extensive and sometimes troubled past. The works of Pulitzer Prize winner Ellen Glasgow often dealt with social inequalities and the role of women in her culture. Glasgow's peer and close friend James Branch Cabell wrote extensively about the changing position of gentry in the Reconstruction era, and challenged its moral code with Jurgen, A Comedy of Justice. William Styron approached history in works such as The Confessions of Nat Turner and Sophie's Choice. Tom Wolfe has occasionally dealt with his southern heritage in bestsellers like I Am Charlotte Simmons. Mount Vernon native Matt Bondurant received critical acclaim for his historic novel The Wettest County in the World about moonshiners in Franklin County during prohibition. Virginia also names a state Poet Laureate.

Fine and performing arts

Virginia ranks near the middle of U.S. states in terms of public spending on the arts , at just over half of the national average. The state government does fund some institutions, including the Virginia Museum of Fine Arts and the Science Museum of Virginia. Other museums include the popular Steven F. Udvar-Hazy Center of the National Air and Space Museum and the Chrysler Museum of Art. Besides these sites, many open-air museums are located in the Commonwealth, such as Colonial Williamsburg, the Frontier Culture Museum, and various historic battlefields. The Virginia Foundation for the Humanities works to improve the Commonwealth's civic, cultural, and intellectual life.

Theaters and venues in the Commonwealth are found both in the cities and in suburbs. The Harrison Opera House, in Norfolk, is home of the Virginia Opera. The Virginia Symphony Orchestra operates in and around Hampton Roads. Resident and touring theater troupes operate from the American Shakespeare Center in Staunton. The Barter Theatre in Abingdon, designated the State Theatre of Virginia, won the first Regional Theatre Tony Award in 1948, while the Signature Theatre in Arlington won it in 2009. There is also a Children's Theater of Virginia, Theatre IV, which is the second largest touring troupe nationwide. Notable music performance venues include The Birchmere, the Landmark Theater, and Jiffy Lube Live. Wolf Trap National Park for the Performing Arts is located in Vienna and is the only national park intended for use as a performing arts center.

Virginia is known for its tradition in the music genres of old-time string and bluegrass, with groups such as the Carter Family and Stanley Brothers. The state's African tradition is found through gospel, blues, and shout bands, with both Ella Fitzgerald and Pearl Bailey coming from Newport News. Contemporary Virginia is also known for folk rock artists like Dave Matthews and Jason Mraz, hip hop stars like Pharrell Williams, Missy Elliott and Pusha T, as well as thrash metal groups like GWAR and Lamb of God. Several members of country music band Old Dominion grew up in the Roanoke area, and took their band name from Virginia's state nickname.

Festivals

Many counties and localities host county fairs and festivals. The Virginia State Fair is held at the Meadow Event Park every September. Also in September is the Neptune Festival in Virginia Beach, which celebrates the city, the waterfront, and regional artists. Norfolk's Harborfest, in June, features boat racing and air shows. Fairfax County also sponsors Celebrate Fairfax! with popular and traditional music performances. The Virginia Lake Festival is held during the third weekend in July in Clarksville. On the Eastern Shore island of Chincoteague the annual Pony Penning of feral Chincoteague ponies at the end of July is a unique local tradition expanded into a week-long carnival.

The Shenandoah Apple Blossom Festival is a six-day festival held annually in Winchester which includes parades and bluegrass concerts. The Old Time Fiddlers' Convention in Galax, begun in 1935, is one of the oldest and largest such events worldwide, and Wolf Trap hosts the Wolf Trap Opera Company, which produces an opera festival every summer. The Blue Ridge Rock Festival has operated since 2017, and has brought as many as 33,000 concert-goers to the Blue Ridge Amphitheater in Pittsylvania County. Two important film festivals, the Virginia Film Festival and the VCU French Film Festival, are held annually in Charlottesville and Richmond, respectively.

Law and government

In 1619, the first Virginia General Assembly met at Jamestown Church, and included 22 locally elected representatives, making Virginia's legislature the oldest of its kind in North America. The elected members became the House of Burgesses in 1642, and governed with the Governor's Council, which was appointed by the British monarchy, until Virginians declared their independence from Britain in 1776. The current General Assembly is the 162nd since that year. The government today functions under the seventh Constitution of Virginia, which was approved by voters in 1970 went into effect in July 1971. It is similar to the federal structure in that it provides for three branches: a strong legislature, an executive, and a unified judicial system.

Virginia's legislature is bicameral with a 100-member House of Delegates and 40-member Senate, who together write the laws for the Commonwealth. Delegates serve two-year terms, while senators serve four-year terms, with the next scheduled elections for both taking place in November 2023. The executive department includes the governor, lieutenant governor, and attorney general, who are elected every four years in separate elections, with the most recent taking place in November 2021. The governor must be at least thirty years old and incumbent governors cannot run for re-election, however the lieutenant governor and attorney general can, and governors can and have served non-consecutive terms. The lieutenant governor is the official head of the Senate, and is responsible for breaking ties. The House elects a Speaker of the House and the Senate elects a President pro tempore, who presides when the lieutenant governor isn't present, and both houses elect a clerk and majority and minority leaders. The governor also nominates their eleven cabinet members and others who head various state departments.

State budgets are biannual and proposed by the governor in even years. Based on data through 2018, the Pew Center on the States found Virginia's government to be above average in running surpluses, and U.S. News & World Report ranked the state eighteenth in fiscal stability. The legislature starts regular sessions on the second Wednesday of every year, which meet for up to 48 days in odd years and 60 days in even years to allow more time for the state budget. After regular sessions end, special sessions can be called either by the governor or with agreement of two-thirds of both houses, and nineteen special sessions have been called since 2000, typically for legislation on preselected issues. Though not a full-time legislature, the Assembly is classified as a hybrid because special sessions are not limited by the state constitution and often last several months.

Judicial system

The judges and justices who make up Virginia's judicial system, also the oldest in America, are elected by a majority vote in both the House and Senate without input from the governor, one way Virginia's legislature is stronger than its executive. The system consists of a hierarchy from the Supreme Court of Virginia and the Court of Appeals of Virginia to the Circuit Courts, the trial courts of general jurisdiction, and the lower General District Courts and Juvenile and Domestic Relations District Courts. The Supreme Court has seven justices who serve twelve-year terms, with a mandatory retirement age of 73. The Supreme Court selects its own Chief Justice from among their seven members, who is informally limited to two four-year terms. Virginia was the last state to guarantee an automatic right of appeal for all civil and criminal cases, and their Court of Appeals increased from eleven to seventeen judges in 2021.

The Code of Virginia is the statutory law, and consists of the codified legislation of the General Assembly. Virginia has no "pocket veto," and bills will become law if the governor chooses to neither approve nor veto legislation. The largest law enforcement agency in Virginia is the Virginia State Police, with 3,022 sworn and civilian members . The Virginia Marine Police patrol coastal areas, and were founded as the "Oyster Navy" in 1864 in response to oyster bed poaching. The Virginia Capitol Police protect the legislature and executive department, and are the oldest police department in the United States, dating to the guards who protected the colonial leadership. The governor can also call upon the Virginia National Guard, which consists of approximately 7,200 army soldiers, 1,200 airmen, 300 Defense Force members, and 400 civilians.

The death penalty was abolished in 2021. Over 1,300 people have been executed by the state since 1608, including 113 following the resumption of capital punishment in 1982. Virginia's prison system incarcerates 30,936 people , 53% of whom are Black, and the state has the sixteenth-highest rate of incarceration in the country, at 422 per 100,000 residents. Prisoner parole was ended in 1995, and Virginia's rate of recidivism of released felons who are re-convicted within three years and sentenced to a year or more is 23.1%, the lowest in the country . Virginia has the fourth lowest violent crime rate and thirteenth lowest property crime rate . Between 2008 and 2017, arrests for drug-related crimes rose 38%, with 71% of those related to marijuana, which Virginia decriminalized in July 2020 and legalized in July 2021.

Politics

Over the past century, Virginia has shifted politically from being a largely rural, conservative, Southern bloc member to a state that is more urbanized, pluralistic, and politically moderate, as both greater enfranchisement and demographic shifts have changed the electorate. Up until the 1970s, Virginia was a racially divided one-party state dominated by the Byrd Organization. They sought to stymie the political power of Northern Virginia, perpetuate segregation, and successfully restricted voter registration such that between 1905 and 1948, roughly one-third of votes in the state were cast by state employees and officeholders themselves, and voter turnout was regularly below ten percent. The organization used malapportionment to manipulate what areas were over-represented in the General Assembly and the U.S. Congress until ordered to end the practice by the 1964 U.S. Supreme Court decision in Davis v. Mann and the 1965 Virginia Supreme Court decision in Wilkins v. Davis respectively.

Enforcement of federal civil rights legislation passed in the mid-1960s helped overturn the state's Jim Crow laws that effectively disfranchised African Americans. The Voting Rights Act of 1965 made Virginia one of nine states that were required to receive federal approval for changes to voting laws, until the system for including states was struck down in 2013. A strict photo identification requirement, added under Governor Bob McDonnell in 2014, was repealed in 2020, and the Voting Rights Act of Virginia was passed in 2021, requiring preclearance from the state Attorney General for local election changes that could result in disenfranchisement, including closing or moving polling sites. Though many Jim Crow provisions were removed in Virginia's 1971 constitution, a lifetime ban on voting for felony convictions was unchanged, and by 2016, up to twenty percent of African Americans in Virginia were disenfranchised because of prior felonies. That year, Governor Terry McAuliffe ended the lifetime ban and individually restored voting rights to over 200,000 ex-felons. These changes moved Virginia from being ranked as the second most difficult state to vote in in 2016, to the twelfth easiest to in 2020.

Regional differences also play a large part in Virginia politics. While urban and expanding suburban areas, including much of Northern Virginia, form the modern Democratic Party base, rural southern and western areas moved to support the Republican Party in response to its "southern strategy" starting around 1970. Rural Democratic support has nevertheless persisted in union-influenced Roanoke in Southwest Virginia, college towns such as Charlottesville and Blacksburg, and the southeastern Black Belt Region. African Americans are the most reliable bloc of Democratic voters, but educational attainment and gender have also become strong indicators of political alignment, with the majority of women in Virginia supporting Democratic presidential candidates since 1980. International immigration and domestic migration into Virginia have also increased the proportion of eligible voters born outside the state from 44% in 1980 to 55% in 2019.

State elections

State elections in Virginia occur in odd-numbered years, with executive department elections occurring in years following U.S. presidential elections and Senate elections occurring in the years prior to presidential elections, as both have four-year terms. House of Delegates elections take place concurrent with each of those elections as delegates have two-year terms. National politics often play a role in state election outcomes, and Virginians have elected governors of the party opposite the U.S. president in eleven of the last twelve contests, with only Terry McAuliffe beating the trend in 2013. McAuliffe, a Democrat, was elected during Barack Obama's second presidential term. Republicans at that time held a supermajority of seats in the House of Delegates, which they had first gained in the 2011 state elections, and a one-vote majority the state senate, both of which they maintained in the 2015 elections. The 2011 and 2015 elections also had the lowest voter turnout in recent history, with just 28.6% and 29.1% of registered voters participating respectively.

The 2017 state elections resulted in Democrats holding the three executive offices, with outgoing lieutenant governor Ralph Northam winning the governorship, Justin Fairfax elected lieutenant governor, and Mark Herring continuing as attorney general. In concurrent House of Delegates elections, Democrats flipped fifteen of the Republicans' previous sixteen-seat majority. Control of the House came down to a tied election in the 94th district, which the Republican won by a drawing of lots, giving the party a slim 51–49 majority in the 2018–19 legislative sessions. At this time, Virginia was ranked as having the most gerrymandered state legislature, as Republicans controlled the House with only 44.5% of the total vote. In 2019, federal courts found that eleven House district lines, including the 94th, were unconstitutionally drawn to discriminate against African Americans. Adjusted districts were used in the 2019 elections, when Democrats won full control of the General Assembly, despite a political crisis earlier that year. Voters in 2020 then passed a referendum to give control of drawing both state and congressional districts to a commission of eight citizens and four legislators from each of the two major parties, rather than the legislature.

In 2021, Glenn Youngkin became the first Republican to win the governor's race since 2009, with his party also winning the races for lieutenant governor and attorney general and gaining seven seats in the House of Delegates, giving them current control of that body.

Federal elections

Though Virginia was considered a "swing state" in the 2008 presidential election, Virginia's thirteen electoral votes were carried in that election and the three since by Democratic candidates, including Joe Biden, who won by over ten percent in 2020, suggesting the state has shifted to being reliably Democratic in presidential elections. Virginia had previously voted for Republican presidential candidates in thirteen out of fourteen presidential elections from 1952 to 2004, including ten in a row from 1968 to 2004. Virginia currently holds its presidential primary election on Super Tuesday, the same day as thirteen other states, with the most recent held on March 3, 2020.

Virginia's two U.S. Senators are in classes 1 and 2. In class 1, Republican incumbent George Allen lost races in 2006 to Democratic newcomer Jim Webb, and again in 2012 to Webb's successor, former Governor Tim Kaine. In 2008, Democrats also won the class 2 seat when former Governor Mark Warner was elected to replace retiring Republican John Warner. Virginia has had eleven U.S. House of Representatives seats since 1993, and control of the majority has flipped four times since then, often as part of "wave elections". In the 2010 mid-term elections, the first under President Obama, Republicans flipped the 2nd and 5th seats from the Democrats, who had flipped both in the previous election, as well as the 9th. In the 2018 mid-terms, the first under President Trump, Democrats took back the 2nd, as well as the 7th and 10th. The 2nd flipped again, to Republican control, in 2022. Currently, Democrats hold six seats to Republicans' five.

Education

Virginia's educational system consistently ranks in the top five states on the U.S. Department of Education's National Assessment of Educational Progress, with Virginia students outperforming the average in all subject areas and grade levels tested. The 2020 Quality Counts report ranked Virginia's K–12 education eighth in the country, with a letter grade of B. All school divisions must adhere to educational standards set forth by the Virginia Department of Education, which maintains an assessment and accreditation regime known as the Standards of Learning to ensure accountability.

Public K–12 schools in Virginia are generally operated by the counties and cities, and not by the state.  a total of 1,290,576 students were enrolled in 2,293 local and regional schools in the Commonwealth, including eight charter schools, and an additional 98 alternative and special education centers across 133 school divisions. 2018 marked the first decline in overall enrollment in public schools, by just over 2,000 students, since 1984. Besides the general public schools in Virginia, there are Governor's Schools and selective magnet schools. The Governor's Schools are a collection of more than forty regional high schools and summer programs intended for gifted students. The Virginia Council for Private Education oversees the regulation of 483 state accredited private schools. An additional 17,283 students receive homeschooling.

In 2019, 91.5% of high school students graduated on-time after four years, an increase of two percent from 2013, and 89.3% of adults over the age 25 had their high school diploma. Virginia has one of the smaller racial gaps in graduation rates among U.S. states, with 89.7% of Black students graduating on time, compared to 94.7% of white students and 97.5% of Asian students. Despite ending school segregation in the 1960s, seven percent of Virginia's public schools were rated as "intensely segregated" by The Civil Rights Project at UCLA in 2019, and the number has risen since 1989, when only three percent were. Virginia has comparatively large public school districts, typically comprising entire counties or cities, and this helps mitigate funding gaps seen in other states such that non-white districts average slightly more funding, $255 per student , than majority white districts. Elementary schools, with Virginia's smallest districts, were found to be more segregated than state middle or high schools by a 2019 VCU study.

Colleges and universities

, Virginia has the sixth highest percent of residents with bachelor's degrees or higher, with 39.5%. The Department of Education recognizes 163 colleges and universities in Virginia. In the 2022 U.S. News & World Report ranking of national public universities, the University of Virginia is ranked 3rd, the College of William and Mary is 13th, Virginia Tech is 23rd, George Mason University is 65th, James Madison University is 72nd, and Virginia Commonwealth University is 83rd. There are 119 private institutions in the state, including Washington and Lee University and the University of Richmond, which are ranked as the country's 11th and 18th best liberal arts colleges respectively.

Virginia Tech and Virginia State University are the state's land-grant universities, and Virginia State is one of five historically black colleges and universities in Virginia. The Virginia Military Institute is the oldest state military college. Virginia also operates 23 community colleges on 40 campuses which enrolled 218,985 degree-seeking students during the 2020–2021 school year. In 2021, the state made community college free for most low- and middle-income students. George Mason University had the largest on-campus enrollment at 38,542 students , though the private Liberty University had the largest total enrollment in the state, with 88,283 online and 15,105 on-campus students in Lynchburg .

Health

Virginia has a mixed health record. The state was ranked 14th in overall health outcomes and 18th for healthy behaviors by the 2022 United Health Foundation's Health Rankings. Among U.S. states, Virginia has the nineteenth lowest rate of premature deaths, with 7,931 per 100,000, and an infant mortality rate of 5.61 per 1,000 live births. The rate of uninsured Virginians dropped to 6.8% in 2022, following an expansion of Medicare in 2019. Falls Church and Loudoun County were both ranked in the top ten healthiest communities in 2020 by U.S. News & World Report.

There are however racial and social health disparities. With high rates of heart disease and diabetes, African Americans in Virginia had an average life expectancy four years lower than whites and twelve years lower than Asian Americans and Latinos in 2017, and were disproportionately affected by COVID-19 during the coronavirus pandemic. African-American mothers are also three times more likely to die while giving birth in the state. Mortality rates among white middle-class Virginians have also been rising, with drug overdose, alcohol poisoning, and suicide as leading causes. Suicides in the state increased by 11% between 2009 and 2021, while deaths from drug overdoses more than doubled in that time.

Weight is an issue for many Virginians, and 32.2% of adults and 14.9% of 10- to 17-year-olds are obese . Additionally, 35% of adults are overweight and 23.3% do not exercise regularly. Smoking in bars and restaurants was banned in January 2010, and the percent of tobacco smokers in the state has declined from 19% in that year to 12.4% in 2022, but an additional 6.8% use e-cigarettes. Virginia does have above average percentage of residents who receive annual immunizations, ranking sixteenth for yearly flu vaccinations. In 2008, Virginia became the first U.S. state to mandate the HPV vaccine for girls for school attendance, and 64.9% of adolescents have the vaccine. , 73.8% of Virginians had received a full COVID-19 vaccine.

The Virginia Board of Health regulates health care facilities, and there are ninety hospitals in Virginia with a combined 17,706 hospital beds . Notable examples include Inova Fairfax Hospital, the largest hospital in the Washington Metropolitan Area, and the VCU Medical Center, located on the medical campus of Virginia Commonwealth University. The University of Virginia Medical Center, part of the University of Virginia Health System, is highly ranked in endocrinology according to U.S. News & World Report. Sentara Norfolk General Hospital, a teaching institution of Eastern Virginia Medical School, was the site of the first successful in-vitro fertilization program. Virginia has a ratio of 254.8 primary care physicians per 10,000 residents, the fifteenth worst rate nationally, and only 228.8 mental health providers per that number, the thirteenth worst nationwide. , the state's eight public mental health care facilities were 96% full, causing delays in admissions.

Media

The Hampton Roads area is the 44th-largest media market in the United States as ranked by Nielsen Media Research, while the Richmond-Petersburg area is 56th and Roanoke-Lynchburg is 71st . Northern Virginia is part of the much larger Washington, D.C. media market, which is the country's 9th-largest.

There are 36 television stations in Virginia, representing each major U.S. network, part of 42 stations which serve Virginia viewers including those broadcasting from neighboring jurisdictions. According the Federal Communications Commission, 595 FCC-licensed FM radio stations broadcast in Virginia, with 239 such AM stations . The nationally available Public Broadcasting Service (PBS) is headquartered in Arlington. Independent PBS affiliates exist throughout Virginia, and the Arlington PBS member station WETA-TV produces programs such as the PBS NewsHour and Washington Week.

The most circulated native newspapers in the Commonwealth are Norfolk's The Virginian-Pilot with around 132,000 subscribers, the Richmond Times-Dispatch with 86,219, and The Roanoke Times . USA Today, which is headquartered in McLean, has seen its daily subscription number decline significantly from over 500,000 in 2019 to just over 180,000 in 2021, but is still the third-most circulated paper nationwide. USA Today is the flagship publication of Gannett, Inc., which merged with GateHouse Media in 2019, and operates over one hundred local newspapers nationwide. In Northern Virginia, The Washington Post is the dominant newspaper and provides local coverage for the region. Politico, which covers national politics, has its offices in Rosslyn.

Transportation

Because of the 1932 Byrd Road Act, the state government controls most of Virginia's roads, instead of a local county authority as is usual in other states. , the Virginia Department of Transportation (VDOT) owns and operates  of the total  of roads in the state, making it the third largest state highway system in the United States. Traffic on Virginia's roads is among the worst in the nation according to the 2019 American Community Survey. The average commute time of 28.7 minutes is the eighth longest among U.S. states, and the Washington Metropolitan Area, which includes Northern Virginia, has the second worst rate of traffic congestion among U.S. cities. About 65.6% of workers in Virginia reported driving alone to work in 2021, the eleventh lowest percent in the U.S., while 8.5% reported carpooling, and Virginia hit peak car usage before the year 2000, making it one of the first such states.

About 3.4% of Virginians commute on public transit, and there were over 171.9 million public transit trips in Virginia in 2019, over 62% of which were done on the Washington Metro transit system, which serves Arlington and Alexandria, and extends into Loudoun and Fairfax Counties. Virginia has Amtrak passenger rail service along several corridors, and Virginia Railway Express (VRE) maintains two commuter lines into Washington, D.C. from Fredericksburg and Manassas. VRE averaged over 90,000 weekly riders in 2019, but saw a dramatic 90% decline in ridership due to the COVID-19 pandemic in 2020. In October 2023, VRE ridership was still less than 50% of pre-pandemic levels, despite a fare-free month, however Amtrak routes in Virginia have passed pre-pandemic levels and served 87,300 passengers in January 2023.

Commuter buses include the Fairfax Connector, FRED buses in Fredericksburg, and OmniRide in Prince William County, while the state-run Virginia Breeze buses run four inter-city routes from Washington, D.C. to Bristol, Blacksburg, Martinsville, and Danville. VDOT operates several free ferries throughout Virginia, the most notable being the Jamestown Ferry which connects Jamestown to Scotland Wharf across the James River.

Virginia has five major airports: Washington Dulles International and Reagan Washington National in Northern Virginia, both of which handle more than twenty million passengers a year, Richmond International southeast of the state capital, and Newport News/Williamsburg International Airport and Norfolk International in Hampton Roads. Several other airports offer limited commercial passenger service, and sixty-six public airports serve the state's aviation needs. The Virginia Port Authority's main seaports are those in Hampton Roads, which carried  of total cargo , the sixth most of United States ports. The Eastern Shore of Virginia is the site of Wallops Flight Facility, a rocket launch center owned by NASA, and the Mid-Atlantic Regional Spaceport, a commercial spaceport. Space tourism is also offered through Vienna-based Space Adventures.

Sports

Virginia is the most populous U.S. state without a major professional sports league franchise. The reasons for this include the lack of any dominant city or market within the state, a reluctance to publicly finance stadiums, and the proximity of teams in Washington, D.C., Baltimore, Charlotte, and Raleigh. A proposed arena in Virginia Beach designed for an NBA franchise became the latest unsuccessful sports initiative when the city council there ended support in 2017. Virginia Beach had previously been considered for an NBA franchise in 1987, which ultimately became the Charlotte Hornets. The Virginia Squires of the ABA started in Norfolk in 1970, but lost momentum after trading "Dr. J" Julius Erving and folded just one month before the ABA–NBA merger in 1976.

Five minor league baseball and two mid-level hockey teams play in Virginia. Norfolk is host to two: The Triple-A Norfolk Tides and the ECHL's Norfolk Admirals. The Double-A Richmond Flying Squirrels began playing at The Diamond in 2010, while the Fredericksburg Nationals, Lynchburg Hillcats, and Salem Red Sox play in the Low-A East league. Loudoun United FC, the reserve team of D.C. United, debuted in the USL Championship in 2019, while the Richmond Kickers of the USL League One have operated since 1993 and are the only team in their league to win both the league championship and the U.S. Open Cup in the same year. The Washington Commanders also have their headquarters in Ashburn and their training facility in Richmond, and the Washington Capitals practice at MedStar Capitals Iceplex in Ballston.

Virginia has many professional caliber golf courses including Kingsmill Resort outside Williamsburg, which hosts an LPGA Tour tournament in May, and the Country Club of Virginia outside Richmond, which hosts a charity classic on the men's senior tour in October. NASCAR currently schedules Cup Series races on two tracks in Virginia: Martinsville Speedway and Richmond Raceway. Virginia natives currently competing in the series include Denny Hamlin and Elliott Sadler. Hampton Roads has produced several Olympic gold medalists, including Gabby Douglas, the first African American to win gymnastics individual all-around gold, and LaShawn Merritt, Francena McCorory, and Michael Cherry, who have all won gold in the 4 × 400 metres relay. Major long-distance races in the state include the Richmond Marathon, the Blue Ridge Marathon on the Parkway, and the Monument Avenue 10K.

College sports

In the absence of professional sports, several of Virginia's collegiate sports programs have attracted strong followings, with a 2015 poll showing that 34% of Virginians were fans of the Virginia Cavaliers and 28% were fans of the rival Virginia Tech Hokies, making both more popular than the surveyed regional professional teams. The men's and women's college basketball programs of the Cavaliers, VCU Rams, and Old Dominion Monarchs have combined for 63 regular season conference championships and 48 conference tournament championships between them . The Hokies football team sustained a 27-year bowl streak between 1993 and 2019; James Madison Dukes football won FCS NCAA Championships in both 2004 and 2016. The overall UVA men's athletics programs won the national Capital One Cup in both 2015 and 2019, and lead the Atlantic Coast Conference in NCAA championships.

Fourteen universities in total compete in NCAA Division I, with multiple programs each in the Atlantic Coast Conference, Atlantic 10 Conference, Big South Conference, and Colonial Athletic Association. Three historically Black schools compete in the Division II Central Intercollegiate Athletic Association, and two others (Hampton and Norfolk State) compete in Division I. Several smaller schools compete in the Old Dominion Athletic Conference and the USA South Athletic Conference of NCAA Division III. The NCAA currently holds its Division III championships in football, men's basketball, volleyball, and softball in Salem. State appropriated funds are not allowed to be used for either operational or capital expenses for intercollegiate athletics.

High school sports
Virginia is also home to several of the nation's top high school basketball programs, including Paul VI Catholic High School and Oak Hill Academy, the latter of which has won nine national championships. In the 2018–2019 school year, 174,224 high school students participated in fourteen girls sports and thirteen boys sports managed by the Virginia High School League, with the most popular sports being football, outdoor track and cross country, soccer, basketball, baseball and softball, and volleyball. Youth soccer leagues outside of the high school system are also popular in the state, and 19 teams from Virginia have won national championships, eighth-most among U.S. states. Access to youth soccer in Virginia however has been found to be highly correlated to race and median household income, with opportunities almost completely disappearing in areas where the non-white population exceeded 90%, particularly in the Southwest and Southside regions of the Commonwealth.

State symbols

Virginia has several nicknames, the oldest of which is the "Old Dominion." King Charles II of England first referred to "our auntient dominion of Virginia" in 1660, the year of his restoration, perhaps because Virginia was home to many of his supporters during the English Civil War. These supporters were called Cavaliers, and the nickname "The Cavalier State" was popularized after the American Civil War. Students at the University of Virginia began using The Cavalier Song as their school fight song in 1925, and the school's sports teams were named Cavaliers after the song. Virginia has also been called the "Mother of Presidents", as eight Virginians have served as President of the United States, including four of the first five.

The state's motto, Sic Semper Tyrannis, translates from Latin as "Thus Always to Tyrants", and is used on the state seal, which is then used on the flag. While the seal was designed in 1776, and the flag was first used in the 1830s, both were made official in 1930. The majority of the other symbols were made official in the late 20th century. The Virginia reel is among the square dances classified as the state dance. In 1940, "Carry Me Back to Old Virginny" was named the state song, but it was retired in 1997 due to its references to slavery. In March 2015, Virginia's government named "Our Great Virginia", which uses the tune of "Oh Shenandoah", as the traditional state song and "Sweet Virginia Breeze" as the popular state song.

 Beverages: Milk, Rye Whiskey
 Boat: Chesapeake Bay deadrise
 Bird: Cardinal
 Dance: Square dancing
 Dog: American Foxhound
 Fish: Brook trout, striped bass
 Flower/Tree: Dogwood
 Fossil: Chesapecten jeffersonius
 Insect: Tiger swallowtail
 Mammal: Virginia big-eared bat
 Motto: Sic Semper Tyrannis
 Nickname: The Old Dominion
 Shell: Eastern oyster
 Slogan: Virginia is for Lovers
 Songs: "Our Great Virginia", "Sweet Virginia Breeze"
 Tartan: Virginia Quadricentennial

See also

 Index of Virginia-related articles
 Outline of Virginia

Notes

References

Bibliography

External links

Government
 State Government website
 Virginia General Assembly
 Virginia's Judicial system

Tourism and recreation
 Virginia Tourism Website
 Virginia State Parks
 Virginia Wildlife Management Areas

Culture and history
 Library of Virginia
 Virginia Museum of Culture and History
 Encyclopedia Virginia

Maps and demographics
 USGS geographic resources of Virginia
 Virginia State Climatology Office
 Virginia State Facts from USDA, Economic Research Service
 

 
1788 establishments in the United States
Former British colonies and protectorates in the Americas
Mid-Atlantic states
Southern United States
States and territories established in 1788
States of the Confederate States of America
States of the East Coast of the United States
States of the United States
Contiguous United States